Sidonie de la Houssaye, born Hélène Perret, pen name Louise Raymond (Edgard, Louisiana, August 17, 1820 – February 18, 1894) was an American-born French language writer of Louisiana Creole descent.

The daughter of Creoles Ursin Perret and Françoise Pain, she received a bilingual education in English and French while living in St. John the Baptist Parish, Louisiana. She married Alexandre Pelletier de la Houssaye when she was thirteen years old, and they had eight sons and one daughter together.

After her husband's death during the American Civil War, she worked as a school teacher in Franklin, Louisiana for an all girl's school that she had created.

Works
Contes d'une grand-mère louisianaise
Pouponne et Balthazar, 1888
Amis et Fortune
Les Quarteronnes de La Nouvelle Orléans (posthumous tetralogy published from 1895 in Le Méchacébé)
 Gina la quarteronne
 Dahlia la quarteronne
 Octavia la quarteronne
 Violetta la quarteronne

References

External links
Emma T. Stafford Sidonie de la Houssaye Collection Emma T. Stafford. Sidonie de la Houssaye Collection, Mss. 1445, Louisiana and Lower Mississippi Valley Collections, LSU Libraries, Baton Rouge, Louisiana.
Sidonie de la Houssaye Papers Sidonie de la Houssaye Papers, Mss. 105, Louisiana and Lower Mississippi Valley Collections, LSU Libraries, Baton Rouge, Louisiana.
www.louisiane.culture.fr
mondesfrancophones.com
Sidonie de la Houssaye Collection Emma T. Stafford Sidonie de la Houssaye Collection, Mss. 1445, Louisiana and Lower Mississippi Valley Collections, LSU Libraries, Baton Rouge, La. (accessed 2/18/2015)
Pouponne et Balthazar on [archive.org]

1820 births
1894 deaths
19th-century American writers
Writers from Louisiana
American writers in French
19th-century American women writers
People from St. John the Baptist Parish, Louisiana
People from Franklin, Louisiana
Pseudonymous women writers
19th-century pseudonymous writers